The ZIS-150 was a Soviet truck. In 1947 it replaced the ZIS-5 truck on the assembly line. Together with the GAZ-51 it was the main Soviet truck during the 1950s, judging by their quantity. A tractor-trailer version of the ZIS-150, the ZIS-120N was sold from 1956 to 1957. In 1957, the base ZIS-150 model was replaced by ZIL-164, which differed outwardly only by vertical grille bars and bumper. ZIS-150 was also manufactured in Braşov, Romania between 1954 and 1960 as the "Steagul Rosu" (Red Flag) SR-101 and in China as the Jiefang CA-10 at First Automobile Works. At least one prototype was built in North Korea under the name "Chollima".

History 
Work on a truck that was going to replace the ZIS-5 started in 1945 when it was clear that the war was going to end in favor of the Allied Forces.

The first prototype was built some months later, and entered the test stage, however, its engine proved to be rather unreliable, so a newer engine was developed, and another prototype was built in 1946, which passed the prototype stage. The first production batch of these trucks was built in 1947, but mass-production did not start until 1948. Nevertheless, despite production of the ZIS-150 starting, the older ZIS-5 truck was produced until 1956.

The ZIS-150 also started getting produced in Georgia, by the KAZ plant. Production of the truck soon started in other Communist countries, such as Romania (under the SR-101 name), in China (under the Jiefang CA-10 name) and a prototype was also built in North Korea under the name Cholima, but did not enter production.

In 1956 the ZiS factories were modernized and renamed to ZiL, due to De-Stalinization, and the truck was renamed to ZIL-150. In 1958 the truck's production ended and the model was replaced by the ZIL-164. Production in China continued until 1986.

Specifications 
4x2 4000 kg truck
Engine: 90 hp/2400 rpm, 6-cyl, 5555 cc
Bore/Stroke: 101.6/114.3 mm
Length: , width: , height: 
Wheelbase: , rear axis clearance: 
Front wheel track: 
Rear track: 
Turning radius on front outer wheel: 
Compression ratio: 6.0
Clutch: twin disk, dry
Gearbox: 5 speeds
Weight (without load): 
Maximal speed (loaded, highway): 
Tyres: 9.00x20 inches
Fuel capacity: 
Fuel consumption:

Variants
ZIS-150: Original production version. Produced 1947–1957.
ZIS-120G: Chassis-cab version for fitting of dump bodies. Produced 1949–1957.
ZIS-120N: Tractor-trailer version. Produced 1956–1957.
ZIS-120R: Prototype cab-chassis version (for tractor), based on ZIS-150V prototype. Produced in 1955.
ZIS-120S: Prototype chassis-cab version (for dump truck), based on ZIS-150V prototype. Produced in 1955.
ZIS-125: Prototype 5 ton version.
ZIS-150A: Prototype four wheel drive version. Produced in 1944.
ZIS-150B: Prototype modernized version of ZIS-150. Produced in 1954.
ZIS-150E & ZIS-150YU: Chassis-cab versions for export markets.
ZIS-150M: Prototype modernized version of ZIS-150. Produced in 1951.
ZIS-150M: Prototype 5 ton version. Produced in 1954.
ZIS-150P: Cowl-chassis version. Produced 1952–1954.
ZIS-150V: Prototype modernized version of ZIS-150. Produced in 1954.
ZIS-151: Three-axle version. Produced 1948–1958.
ZIS-156: LPG-powered version. Produced 1949–1957.
ZIS-156A: Dual-fuel version of ZIS-156. Produced 1953–1957.
ZIS-MMZ-585: Dump truck version. Produced 1950–1955.
ZIL-164: Improved ZIS-150. Produced 1957–1964.
ZIL-164V: Prototype tractor-trailer version. Produced in 1960. 
ZIL-166: Compressed gas version of ZIL-164.
ZIL-166D: As ZIL-166G, except with shielded electrical equipment. Produced in 1963.
ZIL-166G: Prototype LPG cab-chassis (for dump truck). Produced in 1963.
ZIL-166N: Prototype LPG-powered tractor-trailer version. Produced in 1963.

See also

References 

Trucks of the Soviet Union
ZiL vehicles